Ataxia nivisparsa is a species of beetle in the family Cerambycidae. It was described by Henry Walter Bates in 1885. It is known from Costa Rica, Panama and Honduras.

References

Ataxia (beetle)
Beetles described in 1885